The End of the Road (also known as Alaska: The End of the Road) is a 1976 British short documentary film directed by John Armstrong. The film is about British Petroleum's Alaska operations, including the construction of the Trans-Alaska Pipeline System. It was nominated for an Academy Award for Best Documentary Short.

References

External links
Watch The End of the Road at BP Video Library
Watch Alaska: The End of the Road at the Hagley Digital Archives

1976 films
1970s short documentary films
British short documentary films
Documentary films about Alaska
1970s English-language films
1970s British films